Bodo is the surname of:

 Bodo (painter) (born Camille-Pierre Pambu Bodo in 1953), painter from the Democratic Republic of Congo
 Eugeniusz Bodo (1899–1943), Polish actor and director
 Leudinus Bodo, seventh-century bishop of Toul
 Peter Bodo (born 1949), Austrian-born American sportswriter and author